Ambrosi Hoffmann (born 22 March 1977, in Davos) is a Swiss alpine skier.
At the 2002 Winter Olympics, he finished 8th in downhill. He won a bronze medal in super-G at the 2006 Winter Olympics and placed 17th in the downhill event.

References

External links
 

1977 births
Swiss male alpine skiers
Alpine skiers at the 2002 Winter Olympics
Alpine skiers at the 2006 Winter Olympics
Alpine skiers at the 2010 Winter Olympics
Olympic alpine skiers of Switzerland
Medalists at the 2006 Winter Olympics
Olympic medalists in alpine skiing
Olympic bronze medalists for Switzerland
Living people
People from Davos
Sportspeople from Graubünden
21st-century Swiss people